Bello Mandiya is a Nigerian politician, who was the elected Senator for the Katsina South Senatorial district in February 2019 Nigerian general elections on the platform of All Progressives Congress (APC). He was the former chief of staff to the Katsina State governor Aminu Bello Masari.

Education 
He attended the University of Lagos, Nigeria, from where he received his Bachelor of Mass Communication.

References

Members of the Senate (Nigeria)
Living people
Nigerian Muslims
Katsina State
21st-century Nigerian politicians
People from Katsina State
Year of birth missing (living people)